Deonte Burton may refer to:

 Deonte Burton (basketball, born 1991)
 Deonte Burton (basketball, born 1994)